Bünyamin Sezer (born July 4, 1988) is a Turkish  weightlifter competing in the –62 kg division.

He won the silver medal in Snatch category at the 2010 European Weightlifting Championships held in Minsk, Belarus.

Sezer recently won gold at the 2011 European Weightlifting Championships and 2012 European Weightlifting Championships.

Achievements

References

External links
International Weightlifting Federation

1988 births
Living people
Turkish male weightlifters
Olympic weightlifters of Turkey
Weightlifters at the 2012 Summer Olympics
European champions in weightlifting
European champions for Turkey

Mediterranean Games gold medalists for Turkey
Mediterranean Games silver medalists for Turkey
Competitors at the 2013 Mediterranean Games
Mediterranean Games medalists in weightlifting
European Weightlifting Championships medalists
21st-century Turkish people